The  461st Air Control Wing is a joint Air Force/Army unit flying the E-8 J-STARS aircraft. The wing is assigned to Air Combat Command's Ninth Air Force, and is stationed at Robins Air Force Base, Georgia. It was activated on 1 October 2011.

Originally activated as a tactical bomber wing by Tactical Air Command (TAC) in the 1950s, it flew Douglas B-26 Invaders while waiting for delivery of its Martin B-57 Canberras. It was inactivated in 1958, when TAC transferred Blytheville Air Force Base, Arkansas to Strategic Air Command (SAC).  The wing was organized as a strategic wing by SAC at Amarillo Air Force Base, Texas in 1963.  The wing flew Boeing B-52 Stratofortress heavy strategic bombers and Boeing KC-135 Stratotanker heavy air refueling aircraft.  It deployed aircraft and crews to Andersen Air Force Base, Guam for combat operations in Southeast Asia. The wing was inactivated in March 1968 with the retirement of older model B-52s and the impending closure of Amarillo.

Mission
The 461st Air Control Wing is the only active duty Air Force wing operating the E-8C Joint Surveillance Target Attack Radar System (Joint STARS), an advanced ground surveillance and battle management system. Joint STARS detects, locates, classifies, tracks and targets ground movements on the battlefield, communicating real-time information through secure data links with U.S. Forces command posts.

Units
 Headquarters 461st Air Control Wing
 461st Operations Group
 12th Airborne Command and Control Squadron  – E-8C JSTARS
 16th Airborne Command and Control Squadron  – E-8C JSTARS
 330th Combat Training Squadron
 461st Maintenance Group
461st Maintenance Squadron (461 MXS)

History

Tactical Air Command

Prompted by experience in the Korean War, the Air Force decided to increase its air support and air interdiction capabilities to support ground forces.  As part of this increase, it organized the 461st Bombardment Wing at Hill Air Force Base, Utah, in December 1953.  The wing was intended to be a Martin B-57 Canberra unit, but these aircraft were not available, so it was initially equipped with Douglas B-26 Invaders. Officer cadre for the squadron was drawn from 4th Tow Target Squadron at George Air Force Base, California.  Facilities at Hill required development and combat readiness training did not begin until July 1954.

The wing trained in light bomber operations and participated in exercises, including simulated deployments.  On 5 January 1955 the wing received its first B-57B, and was fully equipped by the end of the year.  However, Hill's parking and hangar space was inadequate for the B-57s and even as they began to arrive, the unit anticipated a move to Blytheville Air Force Base, Arkansas, which was being developed by the Corps of Engineers for reopening in 1955. The wing's first operational squadron moved from Hill to Blytheville in October 1955.  Its last squadron was in place on 1 March 1956, and it was joined by wing headquarters and support units in April.

The conversion to the Canberra brought a number of changes.  The new aircraft was subject to several periods of grounding (the wing suffered four major accidents while converting to the Canberra), and faced shortfalls in the number of aircrew available.  The wing's mission also underwent changes, with the delivery of tactical nuclear weapons taking priority over conventional weapons delivery, although conventional weapons remained as a secondary mission. The wing's operational squadrons and group inactivated in January 1958 as Tactical Air Command, under budget pressures, prepared to transfer Blytheville to Strategic Air Command (SAC).  Wing headquarters and support elements inactivated on 1 April 1958, turning the base over to SAC's 4229th Air Base Squadron.

Strategic Air Command

4128th Strategic Wing

On 5 January 1959, SAC established the 4128th Strategic Wing at Amarillo Air Force Base, Texas and assigned it to the 47th Air Division as part of SAC's plan to disperse its Boeing B-52 Stratofortress heavy bombers over a larger number of bases, thus making it more difficult for the Soviet Union to knock out the entire fleet with a surprise first strike. The wing initially comprised three maintenance squadrons and a squadron to provide security for special weapons.  On 1 July, the 58th Aviation Depot Squadron was activated to oversee the wing's special weapons and the wing was transferred to the 810th Air Division.

The wing became operational on 1 February 1960 when the 718th Bombardment Squadron, consisting of 15 B-52s moved to Amarillo from Ellsworth Air Force Base, South Dakota where it had been one of the three squadrons of the 28th Bombardment Wing. One third of the wing's aircraft were maintained on fifteen-minute alert, fully fueled, armed, and ready for combat. In 1962, this was increased to half the wing's aircraft. The 4128th (and later the 461st) continued to maintain an alert commitment until inactivated, except for periods when the wing's aircraft were deployed.  On 1 July 1962 the 4128th 
Wing was reassigned to the 22d Air Division.

Soon after detection of Soviet missiles in Cuba, On 20 October 1962, the 4128th Wing was directed to put two additional bombers on alert. Two days later 1/8 of SAC's B-52s were placed on airborne alert. On 24 October SAC went to DEFCON 2, placing all its combat aircraft on alert. On 21 November tensions from the Cuban Missile Crisis had eased, and SAC returned to normal airborne alert posture. Meanshile, because SAC Strategic Wings could not carry a permanent history or lineage SAC looked for a way to make its Strategic Wings permanent.

461st Bombardment Wing

In 1962, in order to perpetuate the lineage of many currently inactive bombardment units with illustrious World War II records, Headquarters SAC received authority from Headquarters USAF to discontinue its Major Command controlled (MAJCON) strategic wings that were equipped with combat aircraft and to activate Air Force controlled (AFCON) units, most of which were inactive at the time, but which could carry a lineage and history. As a result, the 4128th was replaced by the reactivated 461st Bombardment Wing, Heavy, which assumed its mission, personnel, and equipment on 1 February 1963.

In the same way the 764th Bombardment Squadron, one of the unit's World War II historical bomb squadrons, replaced the 718th Bombardment Squadron.  Under the Dual Deputate organization, all flying and maintenance squadrons were directly assigned to the wing, so no operational group element was activated. The 58th Munitions Maintenance Squadron was reassigned to the 461st, while The 4128th's other maintenance and security squadrons were replaced by ones with the 461st numerical designation of the new wing. Each of the new units assumed the personnel, equipment, and mission of its predecessor.

In April 1963, the wing gained an air refueling capability for its bombers when the 909th Air Refueling Squadron was activated with KC-135 tankers.  The 909th remained with the wing until June 1966, when it moved to March Air Force Base, California and was reassigned. The wing trained with B-52s, maintained heavy bombardment proficiency and participated in numerous operational readiness inspections and military exercises.

In January 1967, the wing deployed its aircraft and crews to Anderson Air Force Base, Guam, where they carried out missions in Southeast Asia as part of a provisional bombardment wing participating in Operation Arc Light.  The wing's planes and personnel returned to Amarillo in July, where they returned to nuclear alert. However, "[i]n December 1965, a few months after the first B-52Bs started leaving the operational inventory, Robert S. McNamara, Secretary of Defense [announced] another phaseout program that would further reduce SAC's bomber force. Basically, this program called for the mid-1971 retirement of all B-52Cs and of several subsequent B-52 models." In addition, in January 1968, announcement was made that Amarillo would close at the end of the year. The wing's last operational B-52 was transferred to another unit on 21 January 1968, and the wing inactivated on 25 March.

Air Combat Command
The 116th Air Control Wing of the Georgia Air National Guard operated as a composite unit, with both Guardsmen and regulars assigned to the same unit.  However, this arrangement proved to be problematic in areas such as military justice jurisdiction, and in other areas.  The Air Force determined to create separate regular and guard units in 2011, and the wing was redesignated as the 461st Air Control Wing and activated in October 2011 when the regular Air Force assumed associate responsibility to the 116th Air Control Wing for the JSTARS mission.

Lineage
 Constituted as the 461st Bombardment Wing, Light on 11 December 1953
 Activated on 23 December 1953
 Redesignated 461st Bombardment Wing, Tactical on 1 October 1955
 Inactivated on 1 April 1958
 Redesignated 461st Bombardment Wing, Heavy and activated on 15 November 1962 (not organized)
 Activated on 15 November 1962
 Organized on 1 February 1963
 Discontinued and inactivated on 25 March 1968
 Redesignated 461st Air Control Wing on 1 September 2011
 Activated on 1 October 2011

Assignments

 Ninth Air Force, 23 December 1953 – 1 April 1958 (attached to Nineteenth Air Force 15 April 1956 – 1 April 1958)
 Strategic Air Command, 15 November 1962 (not organized)
 22d Strategic Aerospace Division, 1 February 1963
 819th Strategic Aerospace Division, 1 July 1964
 Second Air Force, 1 July 1965
 19th Air Division, 2 July 1966 – 25 March 1968
 Ninth Air Force, 7 October 2011 – present

Components

Groups
 461st Bombardment Group (later 461st Operations Group), 23 December 1953 – 8 January 1958, 1 October 2011 – present
 461st Maintenance & Supply Group (later 461st Maintenance Group), 23 December 1953 – 8 January 1958, 1 October 2011 – present
 461st Air Base Group, 23 December 1953 – 1 April 1958

Squadrons
 Operational Squadrons
 764th Bombardment Squadron, 1 February 1963 – 25 March 1968
 909th Air Refueling Squadron, 1 April 1963 – 25 June 1966

 Maintenance Squadrons
 58th Munitions Maintenance Squadron, 1 February 1963 – 25 March 1968
 461st Armament & Electronics Maintenance Squadron, 1 February 1963 – 25 March 1968
 461st Combat Defense Squadron (later 461st Security Police Squadron), 1 February 1963 – 25 March 1968
 461st Field Maintenance Squadron, 1 February 1963 – 25 March 1968
 461st Organizational Maintenance Squadron, 1 February 1963 – 25 March 1968

 Other units
 461st Tactical Infirmary (later 461st Tactical Hospital), 8 April 1956 – 1 April 1958
 4463d USAF Infirmary, 8 April 1956 – 1 April 1958

Stations

 Hill Air Force Base, Utah, 23 December 1953 – 8 April 1956
 Blytheville Air Force Base, Arkansas, 8 April 1956 – 1 April 1958
 Amarillo Air Force Base, Texas, 1 February 1963 – 28 March 1968
 Robins Air Force Base, Georgia, 7 October 2011 – present

Aircraft
 Douglas B-26 Invader, 1953–1956
 Douglas C-47 Skytrain, 1954–1956
 Martin B-57 Canberra, 1955–1958
 Boeing B-52 Stratofortress, 1963–1968
 Boeing KC-135 Stratotanker, 1963–1966
 E-8C Joint STARS, 2011–present

Awards and campaigns

See also
 B-24 Liberator units of the United States Army Air Forces
 List of B-52 Units of the United States Air Force
 List of B-57 units of the United States Air Force
 List of Douglas A-26 Invader operators
 List of Douglas C-47 Skytrain operators
 List of USAF Bomb Wings and Wings assigned to Strategic Air Command
 List of USAF Strategic Wings assigned to the Strategic Air Command

References

Notes
 Explanatory notes

 Citations

Bibliography

Further reading
 

461
Military units and formations in Georgia (U.S. state)
Military units and formations established in 2011